New Ipswich is a town in Hillsborough County, New Hampshire, United States. The population was 5,204 at the 2020 census. New Ipswich, situated on the Massachusetts border, includes the villages of Bank, Davis, Gibson Four Corners, Highbridge, New Ipswich Center, Smithville, and Wilder, though these village designations no longer hold the importance they did in the past. The Wapack Trail passes through the community.

History 

New Ipswich was granted in 1735 to 60 inhabitants of Ipswich, Massachusetts, whence the name is derived, by colonial Governor Jonathan Belcher and the General Court (Assembly) of Massachusetts. Settlement began in 1738, when Abijah Foster arrived with his wife and infant daughter. In 1762, Governor Benning Wentworth incorporated the town as "Ipswich", and then in 1766 as "New Ipswich". New Ipswich Academy, later renamed Appleton Academy after benefactor Samuel Appleton, was chartered in 1789, the second oldest in New Hampshire after Phillips Exeter Academy in Exeter. It would also serve as high school for the nearby communities of Mason and Greenville. In 1969, construction of Mascenic Regional High School was completed, rendering high school teaching in Appleton no more, although the building was still used to teach elementary schoolers and middle schoolers. In 1989 Boynton Middle School completed construction, so Appleton was from then to 2012 an elementary school. Appleton Academy closed in 2012, due to the dangerous conditions of occupying it.

The Souhegan River provided water power for mills, and in 1801, the first woolen mill in the state was established at New Ipswich, followed in 1804 by the first cotton mill. Other early factories produced glass, potash and linseed oil. Cabinet making craftsmen produced elegant furniture. The town's affluence would be expressed in fine architecture, an example of which is the Barrett House, used as a setting for the 1979 Merchant Ivory film The Europeans, based on the novel by Henry James.  Bypassed by the railroad, the early mill town was preserved.

In the past half century, a notable influx of peoples of Finnish descent, particularly of the Apostolic Lutheran Church of America, have settled in New Ipswich. Additionally, migrants from neighboring Massachusetts make up a large percentage of new residents.

Geography
The east and central parts of New Ipswich are drained by the Souhegan River, a northeast-flowing tributary of the Merrimack River. On the west side of the Wapack Range, the northwest corner of town is drained by the Gridley River, a northwest-flowing tributary of the Contoocook River, which continues north to the Merrimack. The southwest part of town, including Mountain Pond, Island Pond, and Binney Pond, comprise headwaters of the Millers River, which flows southwest into Massachusetts, part of the Connecticut River watershed.

Much of the town is made up of the wooded foothills of the Wapack Range. Secondary growth forests have reclaimed the vast majority of the pasture lands that dominated New Ipswich and much of New England at the beginning of the 20th century.

Adjacent municipalities 
 Temple, New Hampshire (north)
 Greenville, New Hampshire (east)
 Mason, New Hampshire (southeast)
 Ashby, Massachusetts (south)
 Ashburnham, Massachusetts (southwest)
 Rindge, New Hampshire (west)
 Sharon, New Hampshire (northwest)

Demographics

As of the census of 2000, there were 4,289 people, 1,350 households, and 1,089 families residing in the town.  The population density was 131.0 people per square mile (50.6/km2).  There were 1,449 housing units at an average density of 44.2 per square mile (17.1/km2).  The racial makeup of the town was 98.55% White, 0.19% African American, 0.12% Native American, 0.37% Asian, 0.14% from other races, and 0.63% from two or more races. Hispanic or Latino of any race were 0.79% of the population. 19.7% were of Finnish, 13.2% French, 13.0% English, 10.4% Irish, 9.7% French Canadian, 6.5% German and 5.6% American ancestry according to Census 2000.

There were 1,350 households, out of which 45.6% had children under the age of 18 living with them, 69.6% were married couples living together, 7.2% had a female householder with no husband present, and 19.3% were non-families. 15.2% of all households were made up of individuals, and 5.6% had someone living alone who was 65 years of age or older.  The average household size was 3.16 and the average family size was 3.55.

In the town, the population was spread out, with 34.5% under the age of 18, 7.7% from 18 to 24, 29.8% from 25 to 44, 20.4% from 45 to 64, and 7.5% who were 65 years of age or older.  The median age was 32 years. For every 100 females, there were 104.8 males.  For every 100 females age 18 and over, there were 101.7 males.

The median income for a household in the town was $53,939, and the median income for a family was $57,865. Males had a median income of $40,887 versus $26,724 for females. The per capita income for the town was $20,210.  About 4.3% of families and 7.1% of the population were below the poverty line, including 10.5% of those under age 18 and 10.1% of those age 65 or over.

New Ipswich has one of the highest population percentages of residents under the age of 18 in New Hampshire.

Notable people 

 Nathan Appleton (1779–1861), merchant, US congressman from Massachusetts; born in New Ipswich
 Samuel Appleton (1766–1853), merchant, philanthropist
 Cecil Bancroft (1839–1901), educator and 8th Principal of Phillips Academy, Andover, Massachusetts
 Benjamin Champney (1817–1907), artist
 Jonas Chickering (1798–1853), piano manufacturer
 Augustus Addison Gould (1805–1866), Harvard-educated conchologist and malacologist
 John Taylor Jones (1802–1851), early Protestant missionary to Thailand

Sites of interest
Barrett House

References

External links
 
 New Hampshire Employment and Labor Market Information Bureau Community Profile

 
Towns in Hillsborough County, New Hampshire
Populated places established in 1762
1762 establishments in New Hampshire
Towns in New Hampshire